Fredrik Sejersted (born 2 July 1965) is a Norwegian jurist, and the current Attorney General of Norway.

He is a son of Francis and Hilde Sejersted. He has been a professor of law at the University of Oslo, and is known for chairing the Sejersted Commission from 2010 until they delivered the Norwegian Official Report 2012:2. He was appointed Attorney General of Norway from 2015, taking over the position after Sven Ole Fagernæs. In 2019, Carl Baudenbacher harshly criticized Sejersted in an op-ed for allegedly trying to undermine the law and courts of the European Free-Trade Area. Sejersted published a rebuttal in a similarly harsh op-ed.

References

1965 births
Living people
Academic staff of the Faculty of Law, University of Oslo
Directors of government agencies of Norway